The 1988 Lorraine Open was a men's tennis tournament played on indoor carpet courts in Metz France, and was part of the 1988 Nabisco Grand Prix. It was the 10th edition of the tournament and took place from 22 February through 29 February 1988. First-seeded Jonas Svensson won the singles title.

Finals

Singles
 Jonas Svensson defeated  Michiel Schapers 6–2, 6–4
 It was Svensson's 1st singles title of the year and the 3rd of his career.

Doubles
 Jaroslav Navrátil /  Tom Nijssen defeated  Rill Baxter /  Nduka Odizor 6–2, 6–7, 7–6

References

External links
 ITF tournament edition details

Lorraine Open
Lorraine Open
Lorraine Open
Lorraine Open, 1988